The Natchez Fire was a wildfire that burned near the California and Oregon Border in Siskiyou County, California, in the United States. The Natchez Fire began on July 15, 2018, due to lightning, and the fire burned a total of  before it was fully contained on October 30, 2018.

Timeline
The Natchez Fire ignited 8 miles north of Happy Camp on July 15, 2018, around 6:30 P.M. PDT, due to lightning. During the next couple of weeks, the Natchez Fire gradually expanded in size, reaching  by July 31, with 15% containment.

The fire continued to burn into the month of August, while continuing to grow. The fire continued to grow in size during the next couple of weeks. On August 31, the Natchez Fire had burned  and was 70% contained.

During the first week of September, the Natchez Fire quickly expanded in size, due to a heat wave and dry conditions, reaching  by September 8, while containment increased only slightly to 74%. Afterward, the Natchez Fire grew at a much slower pace, while firefighters continued making progress on containing the fire. By September 19, the Natchez Fire had reached , while containment increased to 84%. Afterward, the Natchez Fire stopped growing in size while firefighters gradually increased the containment of the wildfire, with containment reaching 89% by October 7. On October 30, 2018, the Natchez Fire was finally 100% contained.

See also
2018 California wildfires
2018 Oregon wildfires

References

2018 California wildfires
Wildfires in Siskiyou County, California